"Filthy/Gorgeous" is a song by American pop-rock band Scissor Sisters. It is the seventh track on their self-titled debut album. Released as the album's fifth and final single in the United Kingdom on January 3, 2005, the song peaked at number five on the UK Singles Chart, making it the band's first British top-five single. It also reached number one on the UK Dance Chart and on the US Billboard Dance Club Songs chart. In Australia, it peaked at number 29 on the ARIA Singles Chart, and in Ireland, it reached number 13.

Music video
Two versions of the music video, directed by John Cameron Mitchell, were made: a full-length, raunchier version featuring semi-explicit scenes in a sex club, and an edited version where those scenes are shown more briefly, out of context, and occasionally obscured. Some scenes are removed completely.

Track listings

US 12-inch vinyl 
A1. "Filthy/Gorgeous" (Paper Faces mix) – 7:46
A2. "Filthy/Gorgeous" (extended 12-inch mix) – 6:15
B1. "Filthy/Gorgeous" (Paper Faces main mix) – 8:53

UK CD single 
 "Filthy/Gorgeous" – 3:48
 "Filthy/Gorgeous" (Paper Faces vocal mix edit) – 4:26
 "Mary" (Mylo mix) – 5:53
 "Filthy/Gorgeous" (gorgeous video)

UK DVD single 
 "Filthy/Gorgeous" (filthy video)
 "Filthy/Gorgeous" – 3:47

UK 12-inch picture disc 
A1. "Filthy/Gorgeous" – 3:48
A2. "Filthy/Gorgeous" (I Love You – See You Next Tuesday mix) – 5:28
B1. "Filthy/Gorgeous" (Paper Faces mix) – 8:53

Australasian CD single 
 "Filthy/Gorgeous" – 3:48
 "Take Me Out" – 4:32
 "Filthy/Gorgeous" (Paper Faces vocal mix edit) – 4:26
 "Filthy/Gorgeous" (I Love You – See You Next Tuesday mix) – 5:28

Credits and personnel
Credits are lifted from the UK CD single liner notes and the Scissor Sisters album booklet.

Studios
 Recorded at 5D Studios (Brooklyn, New York) and The Shed (New York)

Personnel

 Scissor Sisters – performance, production, mixing
 Jake Shears – writing (as Jason Sellards)
 Babydaddy – writing (as Scott Hoffman), recording (5D)
 Ana Matronic – writing (as Ana Lynch)
 Del Marquis
 Paddy Boom

 Ayan Pal – bass
 Daniel Wise – recording (The Shed)
 Neil Harris – mixing
 Spooky – art direction, illustration
 Fury – art direction, design

Charts

Weekly charts

Year-end charts

Certifications

Release history

In popular culture
This song appeared on the soundtrack to Tony Hawk's American Wasteland  and also is the theme to the NBC show Kath & Kim. It was also used in the 2006 film It's a Boy Girl Thing  and the 2014 film Dumb and Dumber To.

See also
 List of number-one dance singles of 2005 (U.S.)

References

External links
 
 Underground Illusion - The Ultimate Scissor Sisters Database

2004 songs
2005 singles
Hi-NRG songs
Polydor Records singles
Scissor Sisters songs
Songs written by Ana Matronic
Songs written by Babydaddy
Songs written by Jake Shears
Universal Records singles